John C. Hull  is a Professor of Derivatives and Risk Management at the Rotman School of Management at the University of Toronto.

He is a respected researcher in the academic field of quantitative finance (see for example the Hull-White model) and is the author of two books on financial derivatives that are widely used texts for market practitioners: "Options, Futures, and Other Derivatives" and "Fundamentals of Futures and Options Markets". He has also written "Risk Management and Financial Institutions" and "Machine Learning in Business: An Introduction to the World of Data Science"

He studied Mathematics at Cambridge University (B.A. & M.A.), and holds an M.A. in Operational Research from Lancaster University and a Ph.D. in Finance from Cranfield University. In 1999, he was awarded the Financial Engineer of the Year Award, by the International Association of Financial Engineers. He has also won many teaching awards, such as the University of Toronto's prestigious Northrop Frye award.

He has twin sons named Peter and David, and a wife named Michelle.

Selected publications
A Neural Network Approach to Understanding Implied Volatility Movements" Quantitative Finance, 2020, forthcoming (with Jay Cao and Jacky Chen)
Funding Long Shots" Journal of Investment Management, 17, 4, 2019 : 1-33 (with Andrew Lo and Roger Stein)
Interest Rate Trees: Extensions and Applications, Quantitative Finance, 18, 7 (2018): 1199-1209 (with Alan White)
Optimal Delta Hedging for Options, Journal of Banking and Finance, 82 (Sept 2017): 180-190 (with Alan White)
A Generalized Procedure for Building Trees for the Short Rate and its Application to Determining Market Implied Volatility Functions, Quantitative Finance, 15,3 (2015): 443-454 (with Alan White) 
Collateral and Credit Issues in Derivatives Pricing, Journal of Credit Risk, 10, 3 (2014): 3-28
The Risk of Tranches Created from Residential Mortgages; with Alan White; Financial Analysts Journal; Issue: 66, 5; 2010; Pages: 54-67
The Valuation of Correlation-Dependent Credit Derivatives Using a Structural Model; with Mirela Predescu, and Alan White; Journal of Credit Risk; Issue: 6, 3; 2010
OTC Derivatives and Central Clearing: Can All Transactions Be Handled; John Hull; Financial Stability Review; Issue: July; 2010; Pages: 71-80
An Improved Implied Copula Model and its Application to the Valuation of Bespoke CDO Tranches; with Alan White; Journal of Investment Management; Issue: 8, 3; 2010; Pages: 11-31
the Valuation of Correlation-Dependent Credit Derivatives; John Hull, mirela Predescu, and Alan White; Journal of Credit Risk; Issue: 6 (3); 2010; Pages: 99-132
The Credit Crunch of 2007: What Went Wrong? Why? What Lessons Can Be Learned?; John Hull; Journal of Credit Risk; Issue: 5, 2; 2009; Pages: 3-18
Dynamic Models of Portfolio Credit Risk; with Alan White; Journal of Derivatives; Issue: 15, 4; 2008; Pages: 9-28

References

External links
 Home page of John Hull at the University of Toronto. This makes available many of his papers for download.
 FixQuotes. Biography and Quotes made by John C. Hull

Alumni of the University of Cambridge
Alumni of Lancaster University
Alumni of Cranfield University
Living people
Financial economists
Academic staff of the University of Toronto
Year of birth missing (living people)